The 2020–21 Cincinnati Bearcats men's basketball team represented the University of Cincinnati in the 2020–21 NCAA Division I men's basketball season. The Bearcats were led by second-year head-coach John Brannen. The team played their home games at Fifth Third Arena as members of the American Athletic Conference. They finished the season 12–11, 8–6 in AAC play to finish in fifth place. They defeated SMU and Wichita State in the AAC tournament before losing to Houston in the championship game. 

On April 3, 2021, the school placed head coach Brannen on paid leave pending an investigation after six Bearcats players decided to transfer following the season. A week later, the school fired Brannen following an investigation into his conduct.

Previous season
The Bearcats finished the 2019–20 season 20–10, 13–5 in AAC play, finishing tied for first place and winning a share of the regular season title. The Cats kept fans on the edge of their seats with a nation-leading seven overtime games. They entered as the No. 1 seed in the AAC tournament, which was ultimately cancelled due to the coronavirus pandemic. The Bearcats were awarded the automatic bid to the 2020 NCAA Division I men's basketball tournament by the conference, before it too was cancelled.

Offseason
In the spring, Keith Williams and Chris Vogt both announced that each would enter the 2020 NBA draft, while retaining the option to return for their senior seasons. In late July, both would option to return for their final seasons of eligibility.

Departing players

Incoming transfers

2020 recruiting class

Preseason

AAC preseason media poll

On October 28, The American released the preseason Poll and other preseason awards

Preseason awards
 All-AAC First Team - Keith Williams
 All-AAC Second Team - Chris Vogt

Roster

Preseason: Viktor Lahkin underwent knee surgery, leading him to sit out indefinitely. 

December 12, 2020: Mamoudou Diarra decided to opt-out of the rest of the season due to COVID-19 concerns.

December 30, 2020: Mamoudou Diarra decided to rejoin the team, while Rapolas Ivanauskas had elected to leave the team to pursue a professional career.

December 31, 2020: Gabe Madsen announced he has elected to opt-out for the remainder of the season.

February 16, 2021: Zach Harvey decided to opt-out of the rest of the season.

February 25, 2021: David DeJulius decided to opt-out of the rest of the season.

March 11, 2021: David DeJulius decided to rejoin the team.

Schedule and results
The Bearcats are currently scheduled to travel to Knoxville for the second part of a home-and-home series with Tennessee and begin a home-and-home series on the road at Georgia.  Cincinnati and Xavier announced they would maintain the Crosstown Shootout during the season.

COVID-19 impact

Due to the ongoing COVID-19 pandemic, the Bearcats schedule is subject to change, including the cancellation or postponement of individual games, the cancellation of the entire season, or games played either with minimal fans or without fans in attendance and just essential personnel.

3 previously scheduled games were cancelled (vs. Louisville, vs. Richmond, @ NKU), as well as the Bearcats appearance in the NIT Season Tip-Off (alongside Arizona, Texas Tech and St. John's). As a response to all these outcomes, UC attempted to organize an Indianapolis-based MTE alongside Duquesne and Loyola-Chicago. Ironically, that too would be cancelled due to COVID.
The games vs. Temple originally scheduled for February 4th was moved to Philadelphia.
The game @ Temple rescheduled for February 12th was moved to Cincinnati. 
The games vs. Houston originally scheduled for February 21st was moved to Houston.
Cincinnati added a game vs. Vanderbilt on March 4 after a previously scheduled game was cancelled.

Prior to the start of the season, UC announced there would be no fans in Fifth Third Arena; only permitting fans in the arena later in the season if it's safe and appropriate to do so. UC was later granted an attendance variance by the State of Ohio which allows for crowds of around 1,135 fans inside the arena for games against Tulane (Feb. 26), Memphis (Feb. 28) and SMU, rescheduled as Vanderbilt, (March 4).

Schedule
Unless otherwise noted, all games had limited or no attendance.

|-
!colspan=12 style=| Regular Season

|-
!colspan=9 style="| AAC Tournament
|-

|-

Awards and honors

American Athletic Conference honors

All-AAC Second Team
Keith Williams

All-AAC Freshman Team
Tari Eason

Weekly honor roll
Week 3: David DeJulius 
Week 5: Keith Williams 
Week 7: Zach Harvey 
Week 11: David DeJulius 
Week 12: Mika Adams-Woods 
Week 15: Jeremiah Davenport 
Week 16: Keith Williams

References

Cincinnati
Cincinnati Bearcats men's basketball seasons
Cincinnati Bearcats men's basketball
Cincinnati Bearcats men's basketball